The 2019 Missouri State Bears soccer team represented the Missouri State University during the 2019 NCAA Division I men's soccer season and the 2019 Missouri Valley Conference men's soccer season. The regular season began on August 30 and concluded on November 5. It was the program's 39th season fielding a men's varsity soccer team, and their 30th season in the Missouri Valley Conference. The 2019 season was Jon Leamy's 28th year as head coach for the program.

The 2019 season has proved to be one of the most successful seasons in the program's history. The program finished the regular season with a perfect 16–0–0 record, and were ranked as high as 9th in the nation in the United Soccer Coaches poll, their highest ranking since 1999. They lost in the Championship game of the MVC Tournament on penalties to Loyola Chicago. In the First Round of the NCAA Soccer Tournament they defeated Denver 1-0. In the second round they lost 2-1 at Central Florida, in Overtime.

Background

Player movement

Departures

Arrivals

Transfers

Roster

Season results

Fall exhibitions

Regular season

Missouri Valley Tournament

NCAA Tournament

Rankings

Season Statistics

Goals 
The leading goal scorer for Missouri State was Matthew Bentley who scored 15 goals during the season. He was the only player to score during the regular season and both MVC and NCAA Tournament. Josh Dolling finished the year with 7 goals in second. Stuart Wilkin rounded out the top three with 5 goals on the season.

Assists

References 

2019
Missouri State Bears
Missouri State Bears
Missouri State Bears men's soccer
Missouri State Bears